Chidinma Ekile (born 2 May 1991), known professionally as Chidinma, is a Nigerian singer, songwriter, and actress. A native of Imo State, Chidinma was born in Ketu, Kosofe, Lagos State. In 2010, she gained prominence after winning the third season of Project Fame West Africa. Following the release of the music video for her "Emi Ni Baller" single, she became the first female musician to peak at number 1 on the MTV Base Official Naija Top 10 chart. In 2011, she released the Sound Sultan-assisted single "Jankoliko". Her eponymous debut album Chidinma was released through the music platform Spinlet; it was supported by the singles "Jankoliko", "Carry You Go", "Kedike" and "Run Dia Mouth". Chidinma won Best Female West African Act at the 2012 Kora Awards and performed "Kedike" at the ceremony. 

In May 2021, Chidinma revealed on Instagram that she made a transition to gospel music and is now engage in Christian ministry. She released her first gospel single, titled "Jehovah Overdo", that same month. On 20 August 2021, Chidinma released her debut extended play New Season. Inspired by the Holy Spirit, the EP was produced entirely by EeZee Tee and comprises seven tracks. Chidinma's second studio album Psalm 16 was released on 14 October 2022. It features collaborations with KS Bloom, Indira, and Buchi.

Career

1991–2010: Early life, educational pursuits, Project Fame, and public image
A native of Imo State, Chidinma Ekile was born on 2 May 1991, in Ketu, Kosofe, Lagos State. She is the sixth of seven children. Chidinma grew up with a disciplinarian father and began singing at the age of six. When she was 10 years old, she joined her church's choir. Chidinma attended primary and secondary school in Ketu before relocating to Ikorodu with her family. She worked as a business promoter in Lagos prior to auditioning for the third season of Project Fame West Africa. She wanted to study mass communication but ended up attaining a sociology degree from the University of Lagos. Chidinma initially declined her admission to the University of Lagos due to her advancement in Project Fame West Africa. In an interview with YNaija, she said she has always taken school seriously and that her decision to enroll at Unilag was inevitable. She also said music wasn't always on her agenda, but decided to give it a try after winning Project Fame. After dying her hair red and getting a mohawk, people started perceiving her as a good girl gone bad. In an interview posted on the Daily Independent website, she said she is still the same person and is evolving and growing as a musician.

Prior to auditioning for the third edition of Project Fame West Africa, Chidinma dreamt of being part of the reality television show. With the help and support from her close knit friend, she left her home in Ikorodu and went to Ultima Studios. She was among the eight thousand contestants that went that year to showcase their talents. Subsequently, Chidinma joined 17 other contestants in the Fame Academy round. For 10 weeks, she and the other contestants were coached by musical professionals: voice coaches, inspirational speakers, established musicians, and music business service providers. Moreover, contestants were taught choreography and several rehearsal drills. Chidinma was announced as the competition's winner on 26 September 2010. She won a number of prizes, including ₦2.5 million, a 2011 Toyota RAV4, and a production deal.

2011–2019:Chidinma, standalone releases, and acting debut
Chidinma started working on her eponymous debut studio album Chidinma after releasing a collaborative project with other season three finalists. The album was scheduled for release in the fourth quarter of 2011. Chidinma spoke about the album briefly and said she put a lot of energy into it. She worked with a number of producers, including Cobhams Asuquo, Tee-Y Mix, WazBeat and Oscar Heman Ackah. On 22 February 2011, she released the Sound Sultan-assisted single "Jankoliko" and "Carry You Go", as the album's lead and second singles, respectively. Both songs were written and produced by Oscar Heman Ackah. In an interview posted on the Weekly Trust website, Chidinma said she was pleased with the positive response she received after the songs were released, and is working hard to improve her craft. On 4 June 2011, Chidinma released the Clarence Peters-directed music video for "Jankoliko". She performed with Dr SID at the MTN Power of 10 Concerts, a ten-city tour that celebrated MTN Nigeria's ten-year anniversary; the tour kicked off in Makurdi on 9 September 2011. On 11 October 2011, she released "Kedike" and "Run Dia Mouth" as the album's third and fourth singles, respectively. "Kedike" translates to "Heartbeat" and was produced by Cobhams Asuquo. In an interview with Entertainment Rave, Chidinma said "Kedike" depicts love and revealed that she and her producers created its name. 

Chidinma won Best Female West African Act at the 2012 Kora Awards. Her award plaque was presented to her by Didier Drogba. In an interview with This Day newspaper, she said, "It was a huge honour to me. I'm grateful to God, my fans and people, who have been part of my success story. Winning Kora is a big achievement for me and I know it is the beginning of better things to come." The Clarance Peters-directed music video for "Kedike" was released on 24 January 2012. Nigerian singer Dammy Krane played Chidinma's love interest in the video. On 14 September 2012, she released the Illbliss and Tha Suspect-assisted single "Emi Ni Baller". The song was produced by Legendury Beatz. It peaked at number 7 on Vanguards list of the Top 10 songs that made 2013. The official remix for "Emi Ni Baller" was released on 22 February 2013. It features vocals by Wizkid and was also produced by Legendury Beatz. In May 2013, Chidinma signed an endorsement deal with MTN Nigeria. Capital Dreams Pictures released the music video for "Emi Ni Baller" on 12 June 2013; it was shot and directed in the U.K by Clarence Peters. On 10 June 2013, Chidinma released the singles "Bless My Hustle", "Kite" and "Jolly", which were produced by Tha Suspect, Del B and Wizzboy, respectively. She was one of the supporting acts on the 2013 Hennessy Artistry Club Tour headlined by D'banj.

On 14 September 2013, Chidinma released the song "Oh Baby". The Flavour N'abania-assisted remix, titled "Oh Baby (You & I)", was released on 29 January 2014. Both songs were produced by Young D. On 3 November 2013, Chidinma performed at the Guinness World of More Concert alongside P-Square, D'banj, Wizkid, Ice Prince, Burna Boy, Olamide, Phyno, Waje, Davido and Tiwa Savage. On 9 November 2013, she performed with Blackstreet at the Butterscotch Evening Experience, a concert held at the Eko Hotels and Suites. On 14 February 2014, she performed at the MTN Valentine Rave Party, alongside Tiwa Savage, Mario and Sound Sultan. On 2 May 2014, Chidinma released the music video for "Oh Baby (You & I)". It was directed by Clarence Peters and stars Ngozi Nwosu and OC Ukeje. On 7 November 2016, Chidinma released the single "Fallen in Love". The song was produced by Masterkraft and mastered by Simi. The accompanying music video for the song was shot in Soweto, South Africa, by Godfather Productions. 

Chidinma made her acting debut in Kunle Afolayan's 2017 film The Bridge. She played the role of Stella, an Igbo lady whose personal relationship is threatened by tribal prejudice and parental plans. In April 2019, the feminine hygiene brand Molped announced Chidinma as its first ever brand ambassador and social media influencer in Nigeria.

2021–present: Gospel music transition, New Season, and Psalm 16
On 2 May 2021, Chidinma released her first gospel single, titled "Jehovah Overdo", along with its music video. Described as "a mellow groovy song of praise", the song was produced by EeZee Tee. The accompanying music video for "Jehovah Overdo" was directed by Avalon Okpe. On 4 May 2021, Chidinma revealed on Instagram that she made a transition to gospel music and is now engage in Christian ministry. During her ministration at Enthronement Assembly, she said she decided to turn a new leaf because she believes that it is "time to work for my father. He is the one who has called me I did not bring myself here". 

On 20 August 2021, Chidinma released her debut extended play New Season. Inspired by the Holy Spirit, the EP was produced by EeZee Tee. It comprises seven tracks, including a bonus track performed entirely in French. A day before its release, she and the gospel band The Gratitude shared the official video for the song "Jesus the Son of God". Chidinma's second studio album, titled Psalm 16, was released on 14 October 2022. Comprising eight soul-lifting tracks, the album was written and performed by Chidinma. It features collaborations with KS Bloom, Indira, and Buchi.

Musical influences
Chidinma has cited Michael Jackson, Bob Marley, Alicia Keys, Whitney Houston, Mariah Carey, Fela Kuti, Omawumi, Onyeka Onwenu, Lagbaja, and Darey Art Alade as her biggest musical influences.

Personal life
In an interview with Guardian Life, Chidinma said she was born blind and couldn't see for a few months. She founded the NMA Foundation to help visually impaired children and young people across Africa. The foundation's name was derived from the last three letters of her name.

Discography

Studio albums
Chidinma (2012)
Psalm 16 (2022)

EPs
40yrs Everlasting (with Flavour)  (2019)
New Season (2021)

Singles

Awards and nominations

See also

 List of Igbo people
 List of Nigerian musicians

References

External links
 

Living people
21st-century Nigerian  women singers
Nigerian women pop singers
Nigerian women singer-songwriters
Singers from Lagos
Yoruba musicians
Igbo musicians
Participants in Nigerian reality television series
1991 births
English-language singers from Nigeria
Yoruba-language singers
University of Lagos alumni